Armanto Ortolano (born 19 February 1965) is a Greek sailor. He competed at the 1984 Summer Olympics, the 1988 Summer Olympics, and the 1992 Summer Olympics.

References

External links
 

1965 births
Living people
Greek male sailors (sport)
Olympic sailors of Greece
Sailors at the 1984 Summer Olympics – Finn
Sailors at the 1988 Summer Olympics – Finn
Sailors at the 1992 Summer Olympics – Finn
Sportspeople from Kassel